Walter "Spec" O'Donnell (April 9, 1911 – October 14, 1986) was an American film actor.

Biography
Born in Fresno, California, in 1911, O'Donnell appeared in more than 190 films between 1923 and 1978. He worked frequently for producer Hal Roach, often appearing in silent comedies as the bratty son of Max Davidson or Charley Chase. His sound-era roles were mostly uncredited bits, often as bellhops, newsboys, and pages; he was playing adolescent roles well into his twenties. He has the unusual distinction of playing the same role (a newsboy) in both an original film and its remake: Princess O'Hara and It Ain't Hay. He died in 1986 in Woodland Hills, Los Angeles.

Selected filmography

 Little Johnny Jones (1923) - Freckle faced Little Boy
 The Barefoot Boy (1923) - Schoolboy
 The Country Kid (1923) - Joe Applegate
 The Darling of New York (1923) - Willie
 The Foolish Virgin (1924) - Little Boy
 Tomorrow's Love (1925)
 The Devil's Cargo (1925) - Jimmy
 The Dressmaker from Paris (1925) - Jim
 Little Annie Rooney (1925)
 The Price of Success (1925)
 Sparrows (1926)
 Private Izzy Murphy (1926)
 Hard Boiled (1926)
 Old Ironsides (1926)
 Why Girls Say No (1927)
 Don't Tell Everything (1927)
 Casey at the Bat (1927)
 Special Delivery (1927)
 Call of the Cuckoo (1927)
 Pass the Gravy (1928)
 A Pair of Tights (1928)
 Vamping Venus (1928)
 Hot News (1928)
 Danger Street (1928)
 In the Headlines (1929)
 The Sophomore (1929)
 The Grand Parade (1930)
 Big Money (1930)
 Two Plus Fours (1930)
 The Big Broadcast (1932)
 Broadway Bill (1934)
 Cain and Mabel (1936)
 Blonde Trouble (1937)
 Here's Flash Casey (1938)
 Angels with Dirty Faces (1938)
 Crazy House (1943)
 The Kid from Brooklyn (1946)
 Footlight Varieties (1951)
 Pat and Mike (1952)
 Convoy (1978) - 18 Wheel Eddie

References
 John Holmstrom, The Moving Picture Boy: An International Encyclopaedia from 1895 to 1995, Norwich, Michael Russell, 1996, p.49.

External links

1911 births
1986 deaths
American male film actors
American male silent film actors
Male actors from Fresno, California
American male child actors
20th-century American male actors